The Château de la Motte-Husson is a Neo-Renaissance style . It is located in the small market town of Martigné-sur-Mayenne, in the Mayenne  of France. The  is currently owned by Dick Strawbridge and his wife Angel. It is the setting for the Channel 4 programme Escape to the Chateau.

History
Henri de Husson received the land as concession from Jeanne "La Voyère d'Aron" in 1394.

The Baglion de la Dufferie family (a French branch of the Baglioni family of Perugia) acquired the estate in 1600. The castle was rebuilt in the enclosure of the old square moat. It consisted of a kitchen, cellar, 4 or 5 bedrooms per top, attic above, a chapel, a portal for a drawbridge, a bedroom on the said portal, a dovecote, on the whole, covered with slates, behind a small courtyard, ditches and moats around the courtyards, a kennel near the gate.

The current façade is reflective of the efforts of Countess Louise-Dorothée de Baglion de la Dufferie (1826–1902), who told her husband that she wanted a grand residence built on the site of the fort. The new structure would be flanked by two large towers, known as 'pepper shakers', and with a double-ramped staircase, five floors and 47 rooms with separate private suites for Master and Lady, with servant quarters on the second floor and attic space. In 2021, Strawbridge estimated that "it would cost the best part of £1million to do the same build today". 

Countess Louise-Dorothée de Baglion de la Dufferie's main residence was near Nantes, about 160 km (100 miles) to the southwest, and the family decided to spend winters in the milder maritime climate, with the château serving as a summer retreat for the family. It had been passed down through generations of the Baglion family. Latterly, Guy de Baglion de la Dufferie had received the title to it in 1954 from Xavier Marie Octave, Count de Baglion de la Dufferie and his wife, Elisabeth Marie Joseph Marthe Charlotte Treton de Vaujuas de Langan, as a part of a dowry. At his death in 1999, it passed to his wife and children. The  remained unoccupied for nearly 40 years when it was put up for sale in 2015.

Renovation
In 2015, the estate was sold by the Baglion de la Dufferie family to British television presenter Dick Strawbridge and his partner Angela for £280,000. At the time of sale, the  had no basic electricity, sewerage, or heating.

Over the following years, the couple, along with their children and Angela's parents, restored the property and the outlying buildings with the help of friends, family, and numerous fans of the show who have paid up to £75 a head to help with renovations. Additional funding for the project has come from a television series called Escape to the Chateau, broadcast on the British channel Channel 4 and devoted to recording the renovation, reuse, and upgrading of the  into a home and family business.

Some members of the de Baglion family still live in the area. In 2021, Dick Strawbridge said this about them: "They have been nothing but welcoming and continued to maintain the property even after we had paid our deposit". 

A full nine seasons were filmed, with the ninth and final season starting to air in the UK on 30 October 2022. The decision to cancel was made with the agreement of Dick and Angel Strawbridge.

Legend of the wolf
For many years a stuffed wolf sat at the top of the staircase. It has pride of place on the landing at the top of the stairs.

Successive owners

Former domain of Motte-Husson (pre-19th century) 
Before 1600 - François de la Chapelle, Lord of Poillé, la Troussière, Fléchigné, and de la Motte-Husson.
1600 - Jacquine de la Dufferie, wife of nobleman Jehan Le Cornu Lord of la Marye.
Before 1611 - Gilles de Baglion de La Dufferie (1582 – 1639), Knight, Lord of la Dufferie, d'Hierré, de la Marie, de la Motte-Husson.
1667 - François de Baglion de La Dufferie (1611–1678), Squire, Lord of la Motte-Husson.
1678 - Jacques de Baglion de La Dufferie (1649–1696), Knight, Count of la Motte, Lord of la Motte-Husson, de Laigné, de Cissé.
1696 - Jacques-Francois de Baglion de La Dufferie (1688–1728), Knight, Count of la Motte, Baron of Poçé and Marçon, and patron of Saint-Georges Church in Martigné-sur-Mayenne.
1728 - Jacques-Bertrand-René-Olivier de Baglion de La Dufferie (1712–1752), Squire, Baron de Poçé and de Marçon, Lord of Martigné, de la Motte-Husson.
1752 - Jacques-Bertrand II de Baglion de La Dufferie (1751–1807), Knight, Marquis, Lord patron and founder of the church and parish of Martigné, de la Motte-Husson.
1807 - Jacques-Bertrand-François Baglion de La Dufferie (1777–1848), Marquis.

Château de la Motte-Husson (since 19th century) 
1848 - Count Jacques Octave Marie de Baglion de la Dufferie (1818–1888), Châtelain de la Motte-Husson in Martigné, wife in 1848 Louise Dorothé de Longueval D'Haraucourt (1826–1902).
1888 - Charles Joseph Robert de Baglion de la Dufferie (1850–1916), Marquis, Officier of the National Order of the Legion of Honor.
1899 - Viscount and Viscountess J. de Baglion de la Dufferie.
1932 - Count Louis Ernest Jules de Baglion de la Dufferie (1854–1941).
1954 - Count Guy de Baglion de la Dufferie.
1999 - Baglion de la Dufferie family.
2015 - Lieutenant Colonel Richard Strawbridge MBE and Angela Newman (Angel Adoree).

Images

See also 
 Châteaux of the Loire Valley
 List of castles in France

References

External links
 
 Maison de Baglion 
 Baglion de la Dufferie 

Castles in Pays de la Loire
Historic house museums in Pays de la Loire
Monuments historiques of Pays de la Loire
Châteaux of the Loire Valley
Houses completed in 1874
Loire Valley
Tourist attractions in Mayenne